George Fiske (October 22, 1835 – October 21, 1918) was an American landscape photographer.

Biography 
Fiske was born on October 22, 1835, in Amherst, New Hampshire. He moved west with his brother to San Francisco. He apprenticed under Charles L. Weed and worked with Carleton E. Watkins, both early Yosemite National Park photographers. 

Fiske and his wife moved to Yosemite in 1879 and lived there until he committed suicide in 1918. Fiske was living alone when he shot himself, and he often told his neighbors he was "tired of living." Most of his negatives were destroyed when his house burned in 1904.

Legacy 
Years later, when photographer Ansel Adams was a boy, his Aunt Mary gave him a copy of James M. Hutchings, In the Heart of the Sierras (1888) when he was sick. The book piqued his interest enough to persuade his parents to vacation in Yosemite National Park in 1916. Most of the photographs in the book are by George Fiske.

After Fiske's death, his remaining negatives were acquired by the Yosemite Park Company and stored neglected in a sawmill attic, which burned in 1943. Ansel Adams suggested they be stored safely in the Yosemite Museum fireproof basement, but his suggestion was ignored. "If that hadn't happened", said Adams, "Fiske could have been revealed today, I firmly believe, as a top photographer, a top interpretive photographer. I really can’t get excited at [Carleton] Watkins and [Eadweard] Muybridge—I do get excited at Fiske. I think he had the better eye." (Hickman & Pitts, 1980).

References 

 Paul Hickman and Terence Pitts, George Fiske, Yosemite Photographer (Flagstaff, AZ: Northland Press, 1980)
 James Mason Hutchings, In the Heart of the Sierras contains many photographs by Fiske
 Galen Clark, The Yosemite Valley (1910) has more photographs by Fiske. Fiske provided the photographs to his good friend Clark as a favor, as Clark desperately needed money and wrote this book to earn some income.

External links

 Photographs of Yosemite Valley and Big Trees of Mariposa County, Calif. by George Fiske, ca. 1883, Museum of New Zealand Te Papa Tongarewa
 Views of Yosemite by George Fiske, ca. 1880-1890, The Bancroft Library

American photographers
Suicides by firearm in California
Yosemite National Park
1835 births
1918 suicides
People from Amherst, New Hampshire
1918 deaths